Hooge Mierde is a village in the municipality of Reusel-De Mierden in the province of North Brabant, the Netherlands. It was formerly part of Hooge en Lage Mierde municipality, and since 1997 it has become part of Reusel-De Mierden.

The village was first mentioned around 1200 as Myrtha, and means "settlement near the swamp". Hooge Mierden is an agricultural village which developed in the Middle Ages on the Campine sand grounds. The Catholic St.-Jan Evangelist Church was built between 1922 and 1923 in expressionist style. The tower from the 15th century remained.

Hooge Mierde was home to 121 people in 1840. It was part of the municipality of Hooge en Lage Mierde until 1997, when it was merged into Reusel-De Mierden.

References 

Populated places in North Brabant
Reusel-De Mierden